South Korean nationality law details the conditions in which an individual is a national of the Republic of Korea (ROK), commonly known as South Korea. Foreign nationals may naturalize after living in the country for at least five years and showing proficiency in the Korean language. All male citizens between the ages of 18 and 35 are required to perform at least 18 months of compulsory military service. North Korean citizens are also considered South Korean nationals, due to the ROK's continuing claims over areas controlled by the Democratic People's Republic of Korea (DPRK).

History 
The Joseon kingdom (renamed the Korean Empire in its final years) did not have codified regulations governing Korean nationality. After the kingdom was annexed by the Empire of Japan, all Koreans became Japanese subjects. Colonial authorities did not explicitly extend Japanese nationality law to the Korean Peninsula, preventing Korean subjects from automatically losing Japanese nationality by naturalizing as foreign citizens elsewhere.

Korea continued to lack formal regulations until 1948, when the United States Army Military Government in Korea enacted temporary measures dealing with nationality as it prepared to establish a South Korean state. Under these measures, a Korean national was defined as any person born to a Korean father. Children born to a Korean mother only inherited her nationality if the father was stateless or had unknown nationality status. Koreans who had acquired a different nationality were considered to have lost Korean nationality, but could have it restored upon renunciation of their foreign nationality or removal from the Japanese koseki. The first native law regulating nationality was passed by the Constituent National Assembly later that year and largely carried over this framework.

The 1948 law placed particular significance on the nationality of male heads of household. Foreign women who married Korean men automatically acquired ROK citizenship but the reverse was not true. When foreign men naturalized as South Koreans, their wives and children were concurrently granted citizenship. Foreign women were also unable to naturalize independently of their husbands. Additionally, all naturalized citizens were prohibited from holding high political or military office. These restrictions on public service were repealed in 1963 and major reforms in 1998 decoupled a woman's nationality from that of her husband.

Acquisition and loss 
Individuals automatically receive South Korean nationality at birth if at least one parent is a South Korean national, whether they are born within the Republic of Korea or overseas.

Foreign permanent residents over the age of 20 may naturalize as ROK citizens after residing in South Korea for more than five years and demonstrating proficiency in the Korean language. The residency requirement is reduced to three years for individuals with a South Korean parent who were not already ROK citizens, and two years for applicants with South Korean spouses. This is further reduced to one year for applicants who have been married to South Koreans for more than three years. Minor children cannot naturalize independently, but may apply with a foreigner parent who is also naturalizing. Successful naturalization applicants are typically required to renounce their previous nationalities within one year, unless they naturalized through marriage. Individuals who are granted nationality by the Ministry of Justice specifically for their exceptional occupational ability or contributions made to the country are also exempt from this requirement. Exempt individuals must alternatively make a declaration not to exercise their foreign nationality within South Korea.

Naturalization was exceptionally rare until 2000; the average number of foreigners acquiring citizenship from 1948 until that point was 34 people per year. Since then, this rate has sharply increased. The cumulative number of naturalized citizens reached 100,000 in 2011 and 200,000 in 2019.

Before 1998, ROK nationality was transferable by descent to children of South Korean fathers (but not mothers). Individuals who can only trace their South Korean ancestry through the maternal line before this year are not ROK citizens at birth. Persons born to South Korean mothers and foreign national fathers between 13 June 1978 and 13 June 1998 were able to apply for South Korean nationality without any residency requirements until 31 December 2004.

South Koreans residing abroad who voluntarily acquire a foreign nationality automatically have their ROK citizenship revoked and are obligated to report this change of status to the Ministry of Justice. ROK nationals may also lose South Korean nationality when they obtain foreign national status indirectly or involuntarily through marriage, adoption, or legal recognition of parentage. These individuals have a six-month period to make a formal declaration of their intention to retain South Korean nationality.

ROK nationality can also be relinquished by application to the Ministry of Justice. Female citizens who are also foreign nationals at birth must declare their intention to retain or renounce ROK nationality before age 22. Male citizens who obtained foreign nationality by birth must make this declaration before 31 March of the year they become age 18. Dual nationals who retain South Korean nationality after this point are subject to conscription orders and are not permitted to renounce ROK nationality until they have completed military service.

Former South Korean nationals may subsequently apply for nationality restoration, subject to the renunciation of their previous nationalities. However, former nationals who reacquire ROK nationality after reaching age 65 with the intention of permanently residing in South Korea are exempt from this requirement.

Rights and restrictions 

South Korean nationals are required to register for South Korean identity cards, eligible to hold Republic of Korea passports, and able to vote in all elections on the national and local level. Dual citizens are prohibited from holding any office that requires them to perform official duties of state. All male citizens between the ages of 18 and 35 are required to perform at least two years of military service. When travelling to foreign destinations, South Koreans may enter 192 countries and territories without a visa, as of 2022.

North Koreans 

Virtually all North Korean citizens are considered South Korean citizens by birth, due to the ROK's continuing claims over areas controlled by the Democratic People's Republic of Korea (DPRK). Upon reaching a South Korean diplomatic mission, North Korean defectors are subject to an investigatory review of their background and nationality. If they are found to be ROK citizens, they are entitled to resettlement in South Korea and would receive financial, medical, employment, and educational support as well as other targeted welfare benefits upon arrival. Male citizens from North Korea are exempt from conscription.

However, the South Korean government does not acknowledge the following groups of DPRK citizens as holding ROK nationality: naturalized DPRK citizens who are not ethnically Korean, North Koreans who have voluntarily acquired a foreign nationality, and North Koreans who can only prove their lineage through maternal descent before 1998. Individuals in the first two groups are denied all forms of protection while those in the last category may be resettled in South Korea on a discretionary basis.

According to a 2021 study, "North Koreans have often struggled to acquire state recognition when making claims to citizenship from abroad, and acquisition of ROK citizenship remains an incremental and contingent process, one that requires a high degree of agency from North Koreans seeking resettlement."

Overseas Koreans 

The South Korean government categorizes ROK nationals and ethnic Korean non-nationals living abroad into several groups based on their emigration status and parental domicile. The term "Overseas Koreans" encompasses both South Korean nationals with permanent residence in another country and ethnic Koreans who formerly held ROK nationality and their descendants.

Within the class of South Korean nationals living abroad are "second-generation South Koreans", which are defined in legislation as ROK nationals who settled abroad at a young age or were born overseas, have lived outside of South Korea until age 18, and whose parents are also permanently residing abroad. The "second-generation" term in this context is not tied to immigrant generations and may be used to describe South Korean nationals whose families have been domiciled abroad for many generations. Nationals of this class who have reported their emigration status to the Ministry of Foreign Affairs may indefinitely defer conscription orders, but would be required to fulfill their service obligations upon their permanent return to South Korea.

Former ROK nationals and their descendants have favored status when resident in South Korea. These individuals have facilitated work authorization, access to the state healthcare system, and rights equivalent to citizens in property purchases and financial transactions.

Zainichi Koreans in Japan 

Zainichi Koreans are ethnic Koreans living in Japan who trace their ancestry to migrants who had permanently settled there before the Second World War. When Korea was a Japanese colony, Koreans were considered to be Japanese subjects but this status was revoked by the Treaty of San Francisco in 1952. After normalization of relations between Japan and South Korea in 1965, the Japanese government granted permanent residency to Zainichi ROK nationals. Korean residents who were previously politically aligned with the DPRK switched their allegiance to the ROK so that they could acquire South Korean nationality and subsequently claim Japanese permanent residence. North Korea-aligned residents were later granted permanent residency in 1982. Both groups were reclassified in 1991 as special permanent residents (SPR), which granted the Zainichi near-total protection from deportation (except in the most severe cases of illicit activity) and expanded their employment opportunities. SPR status is specific to this class of individuals with colonial-era origins; more recent South Korean immigrants to Japan cannot apply for this type of residency.

DPRK-affiliated or non-aligned Zainichi do not actively claim ROK nationality and are treated by the Japanese government as if they were stateless, holding a unique Chōsen-seki designation as an alternative. Although they are considered to already possess ROK nationality, their refusal to exercise that status hinders their ability to travel to South Korea. Chōsen-seki may request permission to enter the ROK with certificates of travel that are issued by South Korean diplomatic missions at their discretion, but these have been increasingly difficult to obtain since 2009.

See also 

 Citizenship of South Korea

References

Citations

Sources

Publications

Legislation